Aces: Iron Eagle III is a 1992 American action film directed by John Glen, produced by Ron Samuels, and written by Kevin Alyn Elders. It is the third installment of the Iron Eagle film series, the first and only entry in the series to be given an R rating and the only entry in the series to not be directed by Sidney J. Furie. Louis Gossett Jr. reprises his role as Brigadier General Charles "Chappy" Sinclair, the only returning cast member from the previous films, starring with Rachel McLish (in her acting debut), Paul Freeman, Sonny Chiba, Horst Buchholz, Christopher Cazenove, Mitchell Ryan, and J. E. Freeman. Retired boxing champion Ray "Boom Boom" Mancini appears in a cameo role.

The film was panned by critics and grossed $2.5 million off of a reported $13.5 million budget. It was followed by a sequel in 1995, Iron Eagle on the Attack, released direct-to-video. it was the final film released by Carolco/New Line's joint venture, Seven Arts.

Plot
U.S. Air Force Brigadier General Charles 'Chappy' Sinclair and his friends Ernst Leichmann, Palmer and Horikoshi run a classic World War II aircraft exhibition at an air show, where they stage dogfights by shooting each other with paint pellets and are "shot down" by landing with smoke emissions. Upon hearing that an old friend named Ramon Morales was killed in a crash in the Gulf of Mexico, Chappy is summoned to Lethridge Air Force Base in Brownsville, Texas, where the remains of Ramon's plane are being examined. Chappy mentions that among Ramon's surviving family members are his sister Anna, who graduated from UCLA on an athletic scholarship, and his father, the mayor of a small Peruvian village. It is discovered that Ramon was shot down while carrying several kilograms of cocaine, which places this case under DEA jurisdiction.

Meanwhile, in Izquitos Village in Peru, former Nazi captain Gustav Kleiss runs a drug cartel while holding Anna, the mayor's daughter, hostage. He is also being aided by USAF General Simms in delivering the drugs overseas. Simms has secretly sided with Kleiss after being informed that his airbase is to be closed down in a matter of months and his forces will be transferred to other bases, and that his command will be terminated and he desires to use his cut on a lavish retirement. As the cartel begins to smuggle their contraband in barrels disguised as U.S. Air Force property, Anna breaks free from her prison and sneaks into the cartel's cargo plane, telling her father she will return with help. After the plane lands in Lethridge, she meets up with Chappy, who informs her that Ramon was killed. She then begs for his help, as Kleiss will kill her family and everyone in the village in four days. Chappy goes to DEA Agent Warren Crawford, who offers to help him if Anna can pinpoint the cartel's location.

During an air exhibition, Chappy's P-38 Lightning is damaged after Leichman's Bf 109 is sabotaged with some live ammunition mixed with the paint rounds, nearly killing Chappy if not for his well-executed emergency landing. Seeing that someone in the Air Force wants him out of the equation, he and his flight team rush to Anna's apartment, where she gives him the location of Kleiss' cartel. The information is handed to Crawford, who finds nothing from surveillance cameras. Following Ramon's funeral, Chappy's friends decide to join him on his flight to Peru. Chappy also convinces air show promoter Stockman to loan him the four World War II planes, promising to return them without a scratch. For this mission, the planes are retrofitted with laser-guided missiles, with Anna providing the targeting from the ground.

Anna and Stockman land in Peru, only to discover that Tee Vee, her landlord, has stowed away during the flight. The mission is compromised when Tee Vee is caught and he and the laser targeting equipment are taken back into the hideout, prompting Kleiss to order his fighter planes to scramble and shoot down the four veteran aces. As the aces fend off the enemy jets, Anna sneaks into the prison compound, frees Tee Vee and recovers the equipment, while at the same time rallies the villagers to revolt against the cartel. Palmer's Spitfire is shot down during a dogfight, but Chappy manages to destroy the cocaine factory. As Simms takes off with a shipment in his cargo aircraft, DEA helicopters led by Warren arrive to assist the aces. Meanwhile, Anna has the villagers safe in the church, only to find out that it has been rigged with explosives. The villagers escape before the church is blown up.

Chappy and Horikoshi pursue the cargo aircraft. After sustaining heavy damage, Horikoshi's Mitsubishi Zero does a kamikaze run that destroys the cargo aircraft, killing himself and Simms. Kleiss arrives at the scene with a prototype Messerschmitt 263, shooting down Leichmann's aircraft. Chappy, however, outsmarts Kleiss with an inverted roll aided by booster rockets before destroying the prototype jet. Kleiss ejects from his jet and lands in the jungle, where he attempts to bribe Anna into taking the jeep behind her, only to be impaled by a spring-loaded Punji stick trap.

Back in Texas, Chappy, Anna and the surviving aces celebrate with a barbecue. Stockman informs Chappy that the Air Force has given him a fleet of mothballed F-86 Sabres to replace the destroyed aircraft, and for him to shut up about the cartel incident. Chappy is also told that the P-38 Lightning is now his; he decides to name it "Shadow Warrior" in honor of Horikoshi.

Cast

 Louis Gossett Jr. as Brigadier General Charles "Chappy" Sinclair
 Rachel McLish as Anna Morales
 Paul Freeman as Gustav Kleiss
 Horst Buchholz as Ernst Leichmann
 Christopher Cazenove as Palmer
 Sonny Chiba as Colonel Sueo Horikoshi
 Fred Dalton Thompson as Stockman
 Mitchell Ryan as General Simms
 Rob Estes as Doyle
 J.E. Freeman as Ames
 Tom Bower as DEA Agent Warren Crawford
 Phill Lewis as "Tee Vee"
 Juan Fernández de Alarcon as Escovez
 Ray "Boom Boom" Mancini as Chico
 Bob Minor as Bigman
 Branscombe Richmond as Rebel Rapist

Production
The aerial filming involved real aircraft mixed with replica aircraft. Replicas included a North American T-6 Texan once used for the film Tora! Tora! Tora! and modified to resemble a Mitsubishi A6M Zero, and four Soko G-2 Galeb aircraft painted to resemble "Peruvian Air Force" fighters. The prototype Scaled Composites ARES was used to resemble the semi-fictional Messerschmitt Me 263.

An authentic North American P-51 Mustang was painted to resemble a Messerschmitt Bf 109. A P-38, at the time named, 'Joltin Josie,' and owned by Planes of Fame in Chino, California, was used as the lead fighter.  Many aerial scenes were filmed around southern Arizona, including Tucson, Marana, Nogales, and Sahuarita. Patagonia Lake and the Patagonia and Santa Rita Mountains can be seen in the aerial dogfights.

This film was originally owned by New Line Cinema (which was later merged with Warner Bros. in March 2008). However, when Alexander Bafer renamed his production company Carolco Pictures, formerly known as Brick Top Productions on January 20, 2015 and Alexander Bafer had left the company on April 7, 2016, this was sold to StudioCanal.

Reception
Critically, Aces: Iron Eagle III fared worse than its predecessors, with a Rotten Tomatoes score of 14% based on reviews from 7 critics. In his review, Richard Harrington of The Washington Post called the film "an uncalled-for continuation of the Iron Eagle series" and mentioned that it is "chock-full of racial and ethnic stereotypes, none of them particularly objectionable, but all of them faintly ridiculous." James Berardinelli gave the film half a star out of 4, saying the plot "is at about a kindergarten level of intelligence, proving once again that low-budget action flicks shouldn't try to develop a storyline -- it only becomes a liability."<ref>Berardinelli, James. "Review: 'Iron Eagle III'." 'ReelViews, June 12, 1992. Retrieved: May 21, 2019.</ref>

References
Notes

Citations

Bibliography

 Beck, Simon D. The Aircraft-Spotter's Film and Television Companion. Jefferson, North Carolina: McFarland & Company, 2016. .
 Christopher, John. The Race for Hitler's X-Planes. The Mill, Gloucestershire: History Press, 2013. .
 Orriss, Bruce. When Hollywood Ruled the Skies: The Post World War II Years''. Hawthorne, California: Aero Associates Inc., 2018. .

External links
 
 

1992 films
1992 action films
American action films
American aviation films
American sequel films
Carolco Pictures films
1990s English-language films
Films about the illegal drug trade
Films directed by John Glen
Films scored by Harry Manfredini
Films set in Peru
Films set in Texas
Films shot in Arizona
Iron Eagle (film series)
Films about the United States Air Force
1990s American films